Francis Higgins (29 January 1882 – 19 August 1948) was a British cyclist. He competed in two events at the 1912 Summer Olympics.

References

External links
 

1882 births
1948 deaths
British male cyclists
Olympic cyclists of Great Britain
Cyclists at the 1912 Summer Olympics
People from St Pancras, London
Cyclists from Greater London